

Karl Eduard Friedrich Arning (10 February 1892 – 17 November 1964) was a general in the Wehrmacht of Nazi Germany during World War II who commanded several divisions. He was a recipient of the Knight's Cross of the Iron Cross.

Arning surrendered to the Red Army troops in the course of the Soviet Prague Offensive in 1945. Convicted in the Soviet Union as a war criminal, he was held until 1955.

Awards and decorations
 German Cross in Gold on 30 April 1943 as Oberst in Grenadier-Regiment 24
 Knight's Cross of the Iron Cross on 11 October 1943 as Oberst and commander of Grenadier-Regiment 24

References

Citations

Bibliography

 
 

1892 births
1964 deaths
Military personnel from Berlin
Major generals of the German Army (Wehrmacht)
German Army personnel of World War I
Prussian Army personnel
Recipients of the Gold German Cross
Recipients of the Knight's Cross of the Iron Cross
German prisoners of war in World War II held by the Soviet Union
Recipients of the clasp to the Iron Cross, 1st class
People from the Province of Brandenburg